Agnippe crinella is a moth in the family Gelechiidae. It is found in North America, where it has been recorded from California.

References

Agnippe
Moths described in 1927
Moths of North America